Edward Southard Little (July 20, 1918 – November 4, 2004) was an American diplomat. He was the United States Ambassador to Chad from 1974 to 1976.

Biography
Edward Little was born on July 20, 1918, in Toledo, Ohio, He was the son of Herbert Woodruff Little and Sara Marie (Southard) Little. He was a member of the Phi Kappa Psi fraternity and was also an economist. He married Marian Elizabeth McCarty (July 13, 1904 – January 5, 1992) on October 17, 1941, and later fought in the United States Navy in World War II. He later joined the U.S. Foreign Service. On October 3, 1974, President Gerald Ford nominated Little to be the United States Ambassador to Chad. He was confirmed on December 7, 1974, and remained in that post until February 23, 1976.

Edward Little died of cancer on November 4, 2004. He is interred at Arlington National Cemetery.

References

External links
 United States Department of State: Chiefs of Mission for Chad
 United States Department of State: Chad
 United States Embassy in N'Djamena

Ambassadors of the United States to Chad
1918 births
2004 deaths
United States Foreign Service personnel
United States Navy personnel of World War II